Azurina is a genus of fish in the family Pomacentridae.

Species
The following species are classified within the genus Azurina:

References

 
Chrominae
Marine fish genera
Taxa named by David Starr Jordan